Ghost Game ( or La-Tha-Pii) is a 2006 Thai horror film about 11 contestants on a reality TV show who must stay in an abandoned military prison where atrocities took place years before.

Plot
1976 in Jedah, the Communist Jiam separatist leader and his men stormed the camp S-11 on his home island Krujaba, he ordered a massacre of the present government soldiers and took 10,000 inhabitants as hostages. When government troops stormed the island, he had executed all the prisoners and killed himself on 9 May, since then the camp itself is May S-11 as a curse. A television team is this advantage, and turns in the stock S-11 a reality show in which the winner gets 5 million baht. The aim is to endure as long as possible in the eerie ruins, with the batch of eleven young people, including Dao and Yut, which were already at the last game this season and Kemtid and Jay. The ghosts make all of their lives difficult and die.

Cast
 Pachornpol Jantieng as Yut
 Kittilak Chulakrian
 Wacharin Jinamulee
 Chanetphaka Korsuwan
 Thanyanan Mahapirun as Jay
 Taweesak Pamornpol
 Supatsiri Patomnupong	as Dao
 Phongsak Rattanapong as Kemtis
 Panweth Saiyakhlaai
 Zeenam Soonthorn

Critics
The film was controversial because the setting closely matched that of Tuol Sleng Genocide Museum, where the Khmer Rouge in Thailand's neighbor, Cambodia, tortured prisoners.

In the film, the prison was called S-11, which closely resembles the name the Khmer Rouge used for Tuol Sleng, S-21. It also depicts piles of skulls and bones, similar to many war memorials around Cambodia.

Production
The producers of the film had in fact wanted to film inside Tuol Sleng, but were refused by the Cambodian government. The film was then made on location in Thailand.

The film outraged Cambodians and calls were made to ban all Thai products. Cambodian genocide researcher Youk Chhang has denounced the film as insensitive and a distortion of history for commercial purposes. It was another low point for Thai-Cambodian relations, which turned violent with the 2003 Phnom Penh riots.

The film's producers apologized and said they had not given the subject enough serious thought.

Release
Though it was banned in Cambodia, the film was given a wide theatrical release in Thailand and later in Singapore.

References
 "Thai 'Ghost Game' execs apologize", Monsters and Critics, April 26, 2006.

External links
 

2006 films
Thai horror films
Thai-language films
Films about the Cambodian genocide
Film controversies in Thailand
Controversies in Cambodia